Noah Togiai (born July 6, 1997) is an American football tight end for the Philadelphia Eagles of the National Football League (NFL). He played college football at Oregon State and was signed as an undrafted free agent by the Eagles in 2020.

College career
Togiai was a member of the Oregon State Beavers for five seasons. As a true freshman he caught 10 passes for 73 yards and one touchdown. After the season, Togiai walked-on to Oregon State's basketball team and played in two games before leaving the team in January 2016 in order to focus on football. He had four receptions for 31 yards and a touchdown in the first game of his sophomore season against Minnesota before using a medical redshirt after spraining ligaments in his right knee in the following game against Idaho. Togiai led the Beavers as a redshirt sophomore 34 receptions and 461 receiving yards with two catches. Togiai missed time during his redshirt junior year due to an ankle injury, starting nine games with 77 yard and three touchdowns on 10 receptions. As a redshirt senior, he caught 44 passes for 406 yards and three touchdowns and was named honorable mention All-Pac-12 Conference. Togiai finished his collegiate career with 102 receptions for 1,048 yards and 10 touchdowns in 44 games played (37 starts).

Professional career

Philadelphia Eagles
Togiai was signed by the Philadelphia Eagles as an undrafted free agent on April 25, 2020. He was waived during final roster cuts on September 5, 2020.

Indianapolis Colts
Togiai was claimed off waivers by the Indianapolis Colts on September 6, 2020. He made his NFL debut on September 20, 2020, against the Minnesota Vikings. He was placed on injured reserve on December 5, 2020. On January 2, 2021, Togiai was activated off of injured reserve.

On August 24. 2021, Togiai was waived/injured and placed on injured reserve. He was released on September 2.

Philadelphia Eagles (second stint)
Togiai signed with to the practice squad of the Philadelphia Eagles on October 11, 2021. He was placed into COVID protocols on December 27 and activated eight days later. He signed a reserve/future contract with the Eagles on January 18, 2022.

On August 30, 2022, Togiai was waived by the Eagles and signed to the practice squad the next day.

Statistics

References

External links
Oregon State Beavers bio
Indianapolis Colts bio

1997 births
Living people
Players of American football from Utah
American football tight ends
Oregon State Beavers football players
Indianapolis Colts players
Philadelphia Eagles players
Oregon State Beavers men's basketball players
People from West Valley City, Utah